Richmond Valley may refer to:

 Richmond Valley Council, New South Wales, Australia
 Richmond Valley, Staten Island, New York
 Richmond Valley (Staten Island Railway station)